Colonel Henry Sandys, 5th Baron Sandys (died 6 April 1644), was an English nobleman and Cavalier officer in the English Civil War.

Sandys was the third and youngest, but only surviving, son of Sir Edwin Sandys  (eldest son of Miles Sandys  and nephew of Edwin Sandys, Archbishop of York) and his wife Elizabeth, daughter of William, 3rd Baron Sandys of The Vyne. Until their marriage in 1586, Sandys' parents were not related, their families having different origins: the family of Archbishop Sandys originated in Cumbria, while the Barons Sandys had their seat at The Vyne, Hampshire.

Sandys married Jane, daughter of Sir William Sandys of Miserden, Gloucestershire. They had the following children:
 William Sandys, 6th Baron Sandys
 Henry Sandys, 7th Baron Sandys
 Miles Sandys (died without offspring)
 Edwin Sandys, 8th Baron Sandys
 Hester Sandys, married Humphrey Noy, son of William Noy, Attorney General
 Alathea Sandys, married Francis Goston
 Mary Sandys, married Dr. Henry Savage, Master of Balliol College, Oxford
 Jane Sandys, married John Harris
 Margaret Sandys, married Sir John Mill 
 Margery Sandys, married Sir Edmund Fortescue 

Due to the Civil War, Sandys was never summoned to Parliament as a peer. Sandys fought on the royalist side, received a mortal wound at the Battle of Cheriton (at Bramdean near Alresford, Hampshire) on 29 March 1644, and died on 6 April.

References

1644 deaths
Henry 5
Royalist military personnel of the English Civil War
People killed in the English Civil War